Ouled Djellal District is a district of Biskra Province, Algeria.

Municipalities
The district has 3 municipalities:
Ouled Djellal
Ech Chaïba
Doucen

References

Districts of Biskra Province